U1 Records is an Indian music company, founded by music composer Yuvan Shankar Raja.

History 
Yuvan Shankar Raja launched his own music label, U1 Records, and public YouTube page in 2015. The label has associated itself with film soundtrack albums and singles by independent artists.

Yuvan launched the website for U1 Records on 10 February 2021, in order to facilitate independent talents to reach the label to show their talent to the world along with exclusive news and pictures.

Discography

Tamil singles

 Muthamida (2019)
Music Composer - Jaya Easwar Ragavan
Lyrics - Yallini Chander

 Selvom Vaa (2017)
 Morada (2017)
 Tholai Thoorathil (2017)
 Imai (2018)
 Iniyazh (2018)
 Nadakum Pathailiye (2018)
 Singariye (2018)
 vidaiyilla vinaa
 Can You hear the world
 Rain song
 Kadhal Kanavu
 Wonder Woman
 Maayavi

Tamil albums

 Yaakkai (2017)
 8 Thottakkal (2017)
 Graghanam (2018)
 Thondan (2017)
 Sathriyan (2017)
 Kurangu Bommai (2017)
 Padaiveeran (2018)
 Sollividavaa (2018)
 Graghanam (2018)
 Semma Botha Aagathey (2018)
 Pyaar Prema Kaadhal (2018)
 Thiripuram (2018)
 Rendaavathu Aattam (2018)
 Genius (2018)
 Savarakathi (2018)
 Nenjam Marappathillai (2021)
 Maanaadu (2021)
 Maamanithan (2022)
 Coffee with Kadhal (2022)

References

External links
Official Youtube Channel

Record label distributors
Companies based in Chennai
Indian record labels
Indian music record labels
Record labels established in 2015
2015 establishments in Tamil Nadu
Indian companies established in 2015